This partial list of city nicknames in Texas compiles the aliases, sobriquets and slogans that cities in Texas are known by (or have been known by historically), officially and unofficially, to locals, outsiders or their tourism boards. The Texas state legislature has officially granted many Texas cities honorary designations as the state's "capital" of something. City nicknames can help in establishing a civic identity, helping outsiders recognize a community or attracting people to a community because of its nickname; promote civic pride; and build community unity. Nicknames and slogans that successfully create a new community "ideology or myth" are also believed to have economic value. Their economic value is difficult to measure, but there are anecdotal reports of cities that have achieved substantial economic benefits by "branding" themselves by adopting new slogans.

Some of the nicknames are positive, while others are derisive. The unofficial nicknames listed here are those that have been used for such a long time or have gained so wide a currency that they have become well known in their own right.

Nicknames by city
A-C
Abilene
 The Key City
 Lene Town (used in hip-hop culture)
Alpine – Gateway to the Big Bend
Amarillo- The Big Brown Flat, Bomb City (due to proximity to the Pantex facility), Yellow City
Anahuac – Alligator Capital of TexasA symbolic "capital" designated by the Texas Legislature, listed in Official Capital Designations , Texas State Library and Archives Commission, accessed July 3, 2008
Anthony – Leap Year Capital of the World (shared with Anthony, New Mexico)
Arlington – The American Dream City
Athens – Blackeyed Pea Capital of the World
Austin
 ATX
 Bat CityWelcome to Bat Conservation International 
 The Capitol City
 The City of Legends
  City of the Violet Crown
 Hippie Haven
 "Blueberry in the Red State"
 Live Music Capital of the World
 River City
 Silicon Hills
The Velvet Rut
 Baird – Antique Capital of Texas
 Bandera – Cowboy Capital of the World
 Bertram – Home of the Oatmeal Festival
 Boerne – Key to the Hill Country
 Brady – The True Heart of Texas 
 Brackettville – Home of John Wayne's The Alamo
 Breckenridge – Mural Capital of Texas
 Brenham – Ice Cream City
 Brownsville – Chess Capital of Texas
 Buda – Outdoor Capital of Texas
 Burnet 
Bluebonnet co-Capital of Texas (with Llano, TX) 
It is pronounced BURN-IT, Durn-it, Can't ya LEARN it?
Caldwell – Kolache Capital of TexasClaims to Fame - Food , Epodunk, accessed April 16, 2007.
Clifton – Norwegian Capital of TexasClaims to Fame - Ethnic Groups , Epodunk, accessed April 16, 2007.
College Station – Aggieland, Cstat
Colorado City – The Heart of West Texas
Commerce – Bois d'arc Capital of Texas
Corpus Christi – Sparkling City by the Sea
Corsicana – Fruit Cake Capital of the World, Cana
Crystal City – Spinach Capital of the World
Cuero – Turkey Capital of the World

D-F
Dallas
Big D
City of Hate
D-Town 
Metroplex (with Fort Worth)
Pegasus City
Triple D
DTX
Danevang – Danish Capital of Texas
Deer Park – The Birthplace of Texas
 Denison – Wine Root Stock Capital of the World
 Denton
Little Austin
Little D
Redbud Capital of Texas
 Dickens – Wild Boar Capital
 Dublin – Irish Capital of Texas
 Duncanville – City of Champions
 Eagle Lake – Goose Hunting Capital  of the World
 Eagle Pass – Where Yee-Ha Meets Olé
 El Paso
The City With a Legend
Chuco Town
El Chuco
EPT
The Sun City
 Electra – Pump Jack Capital of Texas
 Elgin – Sausage Capital of Texas
 Ennis – Bluebonnet City
 Floresville – Peanut Capital of Texas
 Flower Mound – FloMo
 Floydada – Pumpkin Capital
 Fort Davis – Where the Stars Come Out to Play
 Fort Worth
 Cowtown Fort Worth, Texas , Handbook of Texas History Online
 Funky Town
 Panther City
 Metroplex (with Dallas)
 Queen City of the PrairieOliver Knight and Cissy Stewart Lale (1953) Fort Worth , Norman: University of Oklahoma Press, page 109: "Fort Worth in 1880 was being hailed as the Queen City of the Prairie."
 Fort Crunk
 Where the West Begins
The Big Juicy
 Fredericksburg
Fritztown
Polka Capital of Texas
Friona – Cheeseburger Capital of Texas
Frisco - Sports City, USA

G-L
 Gainesville – The Front Porch of Texas
 Galveston – Oleander City, G-town, Galveston Island, Island of Texas
 Gatesville – Spur Capital of Texas
George West – Storyfest Capital of Texas
Georgetown – Red Poppy Capital of Texas
Gilmer – Home of the Yamboree (refers to yams)
Glen Rose – Dinosaur Capital of Texas
Gonzales – Lexington of Texas. (The first battle of the Texas Revolution occurred here; the name is a reference to Lexington, Massachusetts, where the American Revolutionary War began.)
Hamilton – Dove Capital of Texas
Happy – The Town Without a Frown
Hawkins – Pancake Capital of Texas
Hearne – Sunflower Capital of Texas
Hereford – Town Without a Toothache
Houston -- see Nicknames of Houston
Huntsville
Prison City of Texas (the Texas Department of Criminal Justice is headquartered in Huntsville)
Execution Capital of the World/Death Penalty City (Texas' execution chamber is located in Huntsville, and Texas often leads all US states in executions per year; death row was located in Huntsville but later relocated)Huntsville: Death Capital , Religion & Ethics Newsweekly, Episode 637, May 16, 2003
Huntsvegas
 Hutto – Hippo Capital of Texas
Jacksonville – Tomato Capital of the World
Jasper – Butterfly Capital of Texas
Jefferson – Bed and Breakfast Capital of Texas
Jones Creek – Historic City of the Future
Kaufman – Red Tail Hawk Capital
 Kenedy
Horned Lizard Capital of Texas
Texas Horned Lizard Capital of the World
 Kerrville – Lose Your Heart to the Hills, Heavens Waiting Room
 Kilgore – Texas City of Stars
 Killeen – Kill City
 Kingsville – Gem City of the Southwest
 Knox City – Seedless Watermelon Capital of Texas
 Lake Jackson – The City of Enchantment
 Laredo
The City Under Seven Flags
The Gateway City
Linden – Music City Texas
 Llano – Deer Capital of Texas
 Lockhart – Barbecue Capital of Texas
 Longview – Purple Martin Capital of Texas
 Lubbock
Hub City
Hub of the Plains
 Lufkin – Crossroads of East Texas

M-Q
 Madisonville – Mushroom Capital of Texas
 Mansfield - Murdafield
 Marlin – Hot Mineral Water City of Texas
 Mauriceville – Crawfish Capital of Texas
 McAllen
City of Palms
Square Dance Capital of the World
The Texas Tropics
 McCamey – Wind Energy Capital of Texas
 Mercedes - The Queen City
 Mesquite – Rodeo Capital of Texas
 Midland
 Ostrich Capital of Texas
 The Tall City
 Petroplex (shared with Odessa)
Midlothian – Cement and Steel Capital of Texas
Mineola – Birding capital of East Texas
Mission – Home of the Ruby Red Grapefruit
Mineral Wells - Miserable Wells
Mount Pleasant – Bass Capital of Texas
Nacogdoches – The Oldest Town in Texas
Naples – The Watermelon Capital of The World
 Navasota – Blues Capital of Texas
Odessa
 Jackrabbit Capital of Texas or Jackrabbit-Roping Capital of Texas
 Petroplex (shared with Midland)
Palacios
City By The Sea
Shrimp Capital of Texas
Paris – Crape Myrtle City
Plano – Hot Air Balloon Capital of Texas
Port Arthur – Energy CityDavid Ball, Group wants to bring solar energy to Port Arthur , Port Arthur News, December 2, 2008. "Chatman said Port Arthur still wants to be known as energy city."
Quitman – Big Bass Capital of Texas

R-T
 Roanoke – The Unique Dining Capital of Texas
 Rockwall - Live Music Capital of North Texas
 Round Rock – Daffodil Capital of Texas
 San Angelo
 The End of the Rainbow
The Oasis of West Texas (The city is unusual in West Texas for having three rivers and three lakes.)
 Queen City of Central West Texas
 Texas' biggest small town
 Wool Capital or the Wool and Mohair Capital of the World
San Antonio
Alamo City
Countdown City
Spurs Nation
Deuce Dime
River City 
San AntoneOlmsted, Frederick Law, "Journey through Texas, or, A saddle-trip on the southwestern frontier : with a statistical appendix ", Dix, Edwards & Co., New York: 1857, p. 187. Accessed May 24, 2019. University of North Texas Libraries, The Portal to Texas History.  "They give us fifty cent a pound for our butter in San Antone!"Ayala, Christine, "No, Obama, it's not called 'San Antone'" , Dallas Morning News, May, 2016. "The use of "San Antone" is most common in music, featured in songs from Willie Nelson, Johnny Cash and George Strait, to name a few."
Something to Remember
Military City, USA
 San Marcos
 San Marvelous
 Sanderson – Cactus Capital of Texas
 Sansom Park – City on the Move
 Seguin – Pecan Capital of the World
 Shenandoah – More Than Just a Song
 Smiley – Poultry Capital of the World
 Smithville – Heart of the Megalopolis
 Temple – Wildflower Capital of Texas
Terlingua – Chili Capital of the World
Texarkana
Twice as Nice
T-Town
Twin City
TK
Texas City – City by the Bay
The Colony – City by the Lake
The Woodlands
The Hoodlands
The Bubble
Disney Woods
Turkey – Western Swing Capital of the World
Tyler – Rose Capital of the World

U-Z
Victoria – The Crossroads of South Texas
Waco – The Buckle of the Bible Belt
 Waxahachie – Crape Myrtle Capital of Texas, Hachie
 Weatherford
 Cutting horse capital of the world.
 Peach Capital of Texas 
 Watermelon Capital of the World.
 Weslaco – Citrus Capital of Texas
 West – Czech Heritage Capital of Texas
 West Tawakoni – Catfish Capital of Texas
 Wichita Falls – The City That Faith Built, The Falls, Falls Town, Fallsvegas
 Wills Point – Bluebird Capital of Texas

See also
List of city nicknames in the United States
List of municipalities in Texas

References

External links
a list of American and a few Canadian nicknames
U.S. cities list

Texas cities and towns
Populated places in Texas
City nicknames
Texas city nicknames